Robert A. Wood (October 7, 1921 – October 26, 2014) was an American basketball guard who played in the National Basketball Association (NBA). Wood grew up in Rockford, Illinois, he played with the Sheboygan Red Skins during the 1949–50 NBA season. In his one NBA season, Wood averaged 1.2 points per game and 0.2 assists per game.

References

External links
 

1921 births
2014 deaths
American men's basketball players
Basketball players from Wisconsin
Guards (basketball)
Northern Illinois Huskies men's basketball players
People from Roscoe, Illinois
People from Vernon County, Wisconsin
Sheboygan Red Skins players
Sportspeople from Rockford, Illinois